3-Nitrobenzoic acid is an organic compound with the formula C6H4(NO2)CO2H. It is an aromatic compound and under standard conditions, it is an off-white solid. The two substituents are in a meta position with respect to each other, giving the alternative name of m-nitrobenzoic acid. This compound can be useful as it is a precursor to 3-aminobenzoic acid, which is used to prepare some dyes.

Preparation
It is prepared by nitration of benzoic acid at low temperatures. Both 2-Nitrobenzoic acid and 4-Nitrobenzoic acid are produced as side products, with yields of approximately 20% and 1.5% respectively. Since carboxylic acid functional groups are electron withdrawing, during an electrophilic aromatic substitution reaction of nitration, substituents are directed to a meta position which explains this regiochemistry.  

A less efficient route involves nitration of methyl benzoate, followed by hydrolysis. Alternatively, oxidative C-C bond cleavage of 3-nitroacetophenone to the corresponding aryl carboxylic acid, has been demonstrated. A further synthesis involves the oxidation of 3-nitrobenzaldehyde.

Properties
With a pKa of 3.47,  3-nitrobenzoic acid is about ten times more acidic than benzoic acid. The conjugate base of benzoic acid is stabilised by the presence of the electron withdrawing nitro group which explains its increased acidity in comparison to unsubstituted benzoic acid.  It is typically soluble in oxygenated and chlorinated solvents.

Reactivity 
The presence of both carboxylic acid and nitro functional groups deactivate the ring with respect to electrophilic aromatic substitution reactions.

Safety
This compound can cause skin and eye irritation with symptoms of exposure including methemoglobin, sensitisation, irritation, and corneal damage.

References

Benzoic acids
Nitrobenzenes